Stizoides foxi, or Fox's stizoide, is a species of sand wasp in the family Crabronidae.  It is found in Central America and North America.

References

Further reading

External links

 

Crabronidae
Insects described in 1963